Eumone Baratta (born 1823~After 1890) was an Italian sculptor.

He was born in Carrara, and began studies in his native city. There in 1847, he was awarded a two-year pension to study in Rome, from where he sent back to his home town three sculptures:

Jesus at the Column
A Mother's Education
Huntress accompanying Diana

He participated in the defense of Rome against the French, and after the defeat of the Roman Republic, he remained in Rome and Florence. In 1858, he became professor of sculpture in the Accademia di Belle Arti of Carrara. He published a satirical comedy entitled Onestà e Valore, where he satirizes foreign sculptors and their methods. Among his works:

Olindo and Sofronia condemned to be burned alive 
Jesus in his Tomb
Love and Fidelity
Jesus disputes the Doctors
Bacchant
Mansuetudine (first prize, Esposizione romana delle Opere d'Arte relative al culto cattolico, 1870).

References

1823 births
Year of death missing
19th-century Italian sculptors
Italian male sculptors
People from Carrara
19th-century Italian male artists